Lee Darren Boxell (born 16 February 1973) was a British schoolboy who disappeared from the London Borough of Sutton in England on 10 September 1988, aged 15. He was last seen in Sutton High Street before saying he might go to watch a football match at Selhurst Park in Croydon.

Despite a lengthy police investigation and numerous appeals, there have been no further sightings of Boxell since the day of his disappearance. His parents, Peter and Christine, have kept his bedroom exactly how it was the day he went missing.

Disappearance
On the morning of Saturday 10 September 1988, Lee Boxell left his home in Cheam, in the London Borough of Sutton, to meet a friend at 11am in nearby town of Sutton. Boxell and his friend spent a couple of hours window shopping and parted company at 1pm. When he was leaving, Boxell said he might go to Selhurst Park football stadium to watch a match between Charlton Athletic F.C. and Millwall F.C.

Despite extensive appeals on both the BBC's Crimewatch and at Selhurst Park and other football stadiums, no one has come forward with any confirmed sightings of Boxell at any of the football grounds in the area. However, a witness did come forward to say that they had spotted Boxell outside a Tesco location on Sutton High Street (now an Asda) at 2:20pm. This meant it was unlikely that Boxell would have made it to any of the football grounds in the area in time for a 3pm kick off. Boxell has not been seen since.

Subsequent events
In 2012, a further witness stated that Boxell attended an unofficial youth club in the annexe of St Dunstan's Church in Cheam, known as "The Shed", which was previously unknown to the police. Following extensive inquiries the police found out that paedophiles were operating in the area at the time Boxell disappeared. William Lambert, the St Dunstan's graveyard digger who ran The Shed, was jailed for eleven years in 2011, when he was aged 75, after sexually abusing four girls who attended the club. Between June and September 2012 the police excavated part of the St Dunstan's graveyard, digs which resumed in April 2013.

In 2013, to coincide with what would have been Boxell's 40th birthday, Crimewatch featured another appeal for information, working on the new theory that Boxell attended The Shed on the day he disappeared. Following this appeal, there was an allegation of sexual abuse never before reported, and police began working on the theory that "Lee may have died after intervening to try to stop sexual abuse at a youth club in Cheam".

In 2018, a Scotland Yard spokesman confirmed that cold case detectives had interviewed a potential witness and new information was being investigated that could lead to Boxell's remains being found. The following year, Boxell was featured in a missing person campaign promoted by Italian football club AS Roma.

Potential suspects
In 2001, links were suggested between Boxell's disappearance and Brian Lunn Field, a paedophile and serial sex offender who has recently been arrested for the 1968 murder of Roy Tutill. His body was found in woodland three days later. Tutill had been abducted from a street in Chessington, less than four miles away from Sutton where Boxell was last seen. Boxell's mother dismissed a link, stating that she believed Field was in prison from 1987 to 1990. However this is inaccurate, as although Field was convicted in 1986 of the abduction of two boys in his car and given a four-year sentence, he did not serve the whole sentence and was released in 1988 (the same year Boxell disappeared). Field is also suspected by police of being responsible for the abduction and murder of Patrick Warren and David Spencer, two boys who vanished from Solihull, West Midlands, in 1996 while Field was driving around in a van in the vicinity of where they were last seen. These boys have also never been found.

See also
List of people who disappeared
Disappearance of Patrick Warren and David Spencer – the disappearance of two schoolboys in 1996 which is suspected to be the work of Brian Lunn Field, who has been linked to Boxell's disappearance 
Murder of Roy Tutill – involved the abduction of a 14-year-old schoolboy from the street less than 4 miles away from where Boxell was last seen, carried out by Brian Lunn Field who has also been linked to Boxell's disappearance
Murder of Lindsay Rimer – unsolved 1994 case of a British child who disappeared from Yorkshire and was found one year later in a nearby canal

References

Further reading

External links
Lee Boxell on Missing People
Lee Boxell disappearance on BBC Crimewatch UK on 08/12/1988 at 9:32 mins-12:10 mins
Lee Boxell disappearance on BBC Crimewatch UK Update on 08/12/1988 at 08:00 mins-08:35 mins 
Lee Boxell disappearance on BBC Crimewatch on 14/02/2013

1988 in London
1980s missing person cases
Incidents of violence against boys
History of the London Borough of Sutton
Unsolved murders in London
Missing English children
Missing person cases in London
September 1988 events in the United Kingdom